Nathan Wright may refer to:

 Nathan Wright (judge) (1654–1721), English judge
 Nathan Wright (footballer) (born 1994), Australian rules footballer
 Nathan Wright (actor) (born 1979), British actor

See also
Nathaniel Wright (1785–1858), American businessman and lawyer